Lillehei is a surname. Notable people with the surname include:

C. Walton Lillehei (1918–1999), American surgeon
Richard C. Lillehei (1918–1981), American surgeon